Herman Winick (born June 27, 1932) is an American scientist and Professor Emeritus at the Stanford Linear Accelerator Center (SLAC) and the Applied Physics Department of Stanford University.

Biography

After receiving his AB (1953) and PhD (1957) in physics from Columbia University, he continued work in experimental high energy physics at the University of Rochester (1957–59) and then as a member of the scientific staff and Assistant Director of the Cambridge Electron Accelerator at Harvard University (1959–73).

Work

He is best known for his leadership role, starting in the mid-1970s, in the development of wiggler and undulator magnet insertion devices as advanced synchrotron radiation sources.

Since retirement he is focusing largely on synchrotron light sources in developing countries such as the International Centre for Synchrotron-Light for Experimental Science Applications in the Middle East (SESAME), work he began in 1998, the African Light Source and the Mexican Light Source.

Human rights activities 

His human rights activities started in the 1980s working on behalf of dissidents from the China, Iran, the Soviet Union, and other countries.

Award
In 2005 he received the Heinz R. Pagels Human Rights of Scientists Award from the New York Academy of Sciences.

Winick received the third Andrei Sakharov Prize from the American Physical Society (APS) in 2010 "for tireless and effective personal leadership in defense of human rights of scientists throughout the world".

References

External links
 Herman Winick, Professor (Emeritus) at Photon Science, SLAC National Accelerator Laboratory

1932 births
21st-century American physicists
Philosophers of science
Living people